Samoana is a genus of tropical, air-breathing, land snails, terrestrial pulmonate gastropod mollusks in the family Partulidae.

Species 
Species within the genus Samoana include:
 Samoana abbreviata (Mousson, 1869), Short Samoan tree snail
 Samoana alabastrina (L. Pfeiffer, 1857)
 Samoana annectens  (Pease, 1865)
 Samoana attenuata (Pease, 1865)
 Samoana bellula (Hartman, 1885)
 Samoana burchi Y. Kondo, 1973
 Samoana conica (A. Gould, 1847)
 Samoana cramptoni Pilsbry & C. M. Cooke, 1934
 Samoana decussatula (L. Pfeiffer, 1850)
 Samoana diaphana  (Crampton & C. M. Cooke, 1953)
 Samoana dryas  (Crampton & C. M. Cooke, 1953)
 Samoana fragilis (Férussac, 1821)
 Samoana ganymedes  (L. Pfeiffer, 1846)
 Samoana gonochila (L. Pfeiffer, 1847)
 Samoana hamadryas 
 Samoana inflata (Reeve, 1842)
 Samoana magdalinae  
 Samoana margaritae (Crampton & C. M. Cooke, 1933)
 Samoana medana Y. Kondo & J. B. Burch, 1989
 Samoana meyeri   
 Samoana minuta (L. Pfeiffer, 1857)
 Samoana oreas
 Samoana pilsbryi Gerlach, 2016
 Samoana stevensoniana (Pilsbry, 1909)
 Samoana strigata 
 Samoana thurstoni (Crampton & C. M. Cooke, 1930)
Synonyms
 Samoana canalis (Mousson, 1865): synonym of Samoana conica (A. Gould, 1847)
 Samoana jackieburchi Y. Kondo, 1981: synonym of Partula jackieburchi (Y. Kondo, 1981) (original combination)

A cladogram showing the phylogenic relations of Samoana and three of its investigated species:

Description 
The genus Samoana was defined by American malacologist Henry Augustus Pilsbry in Manual of Conchology in 1909:

In 1909, Pilsbry assigned six species to the genus Samoana.

References 
This article incorporates public domain text from the reference.

External links 

Partulidae evolution, diversity and conservation Partula Pages

 
Partulidae
Taxonomy articles created by Polbot